In artificial intelligence, a behavior selection algorithm, or action selection algorithm, is an algorithm that selects appropriate behaviors or actions for one or more intelligent agents. In game artificial intelligence, it selects behaviors or actions for one or more non-player characters. Common behavior selection algorithms include:

Finite-state machines
Hierarchical finite-state machines
Decision trees
Behavior trees
Hierarchical task networks
Hierarchical control systems
Utility systems
Dialogue tree (for selecting what to say)

Related concepts 

In application programming, run-time selection of the behavior of a specific method is referred to as the strategy design pattern.

See also 
 Cognitive model - all cognitive models exhibit behavior in terms of making decisions (taking action), making errors, and with various reaction times.
 Behavioral modeling, in systems theory
 Behavioral modeling in hydrology
 Behavioral modeling in computer-aided design
 Behavioral modeling language
 Case-based reasoning, solving new problems based on solutions of past problems
 Model-based reasoning
 Synthetic intelligence
 Weak AI

References 

Artificial intelligence
Game artificial intelligence
Algorithms
Computational neuroscience